Alina Astrova, who uses the recording alias Lolina, and previously Inga Copeland, is an Estonian experimental electronic musician and singer, living in London. She has released music on her own as well as with Dean Blunt, including but not limited to their project Hype Williams.

Life and work
Astrova was born in Samara, Russia. Her family moved to Tallinn, Estonia when she was a child. At 17, she moved to London to study art criticism at Central Saint Martins College of Art and Design.

Between 2007 and 2016 Astrova was vocalist in avant-garde duo Hype Williams, with Dean Blunt. The pair also released music as "Dean Blunt and Inga Copeland".

Discography

Solo

As Inga Copeland

Albums
Because I'm Worth It

Singles and EPs
Relaxin' with Lolina (self-released, 2015)

As Lolina

Albums
Live In Paris (2016)
The Smoke (2018)
Who is experimental music? (2019)
Live in Geneva (2019)
Face The Music (2022)

EPs
Lolita (2017)

With Dean Blunt

Black Is Beautiful (Hyperdub, 2012) – as Dean Blunt and Inga Copeland

References

External links

Year of birth missing (living people)
Living people
21st-century Estonian musicians
21st-century Estonian singers
21st-century Estonian women musicians
21st-century Estonian women singers
Estonian electronic musicians
Musicians from Samara, Russia
Musicians from Tallinn
Russian emigrants to Estonia